Potassium octachlorodirhenate(III) is an inorganic compound with the formula K2Re2Cl8. This dark blue salt is well known as an early example of a compound featuring quadruple bond between its metal centers. Although the compound has no practical value, its characterization was significant in opening a new field of research into complexes with quadruple bonds.

Synthesis and reactions 
Soviet chemists first reported K2[Re2Cl8] in 1954, but it was not until 1964 that Cotton and Harris characterized the compound as featuring a short Re–Re bond, the first of its kind discovered. The results of this classic study subsequently led to new work into other metals capable of forming metal–metal bonds, such as chromium, molybdenum, tungsten, and technetium.

A high-yield synthesis of the tetrabutylammonium salt involves treating the perrhenate salt with benzoyl chloride followed by HCl: 
2 [(n-C4H9)4N]ReO4 + 8 C6H5COCl → [(n-C4H9)4N]2[Re2Cl8] + organic products

Octachlorodirhenate(III) is a precursor to other complexes with multiply-bonded rhenium centers as the quadruple bond is quite stable and is often maintained in ligand substitution reactions.  For example, upon treatment with concentrated HBr, the complex forms the analogous anion [Re2Br8]2−, which can easily be converted into other dirhenium species.

Structure and bonding

In the [Re2Cl8]2−, the Re–Re bond distance is 2.24 Å, the Re–Re–Cl bond angles are 104°, and the Cl–Re–Cl angles are 87°. The chloride ligands are fully eclipsed. Although this geometry results in repulsive interactions between the chloride ions, this conformation allows for maximum δ–δ overlap between the Re(III) centers, a factor which overrides the unfavorable chloride repulsions. The [Re2Cl8]2− anion has a weak electrophilic character. With the configuration, Re(III) is well suited to engage in quadruple bonding. Electrons are allocated to give the configuration σ2π4δ2, resulting in a bond order of 4 between the rhenium centers. The brilliant color of the [Re2Cl8]2− arises from the δ→δ* electronic transition.

References

Rhenium compounds
Chlorides
Metal halides
Chloro complexes
Potassium compounds
Chlorometallates